Alizé Cornet was the defending champion, but lost in the final. Fiona Ferro won her first career WTA Tour singles title, defeating Cornet in the final, 6–1, 2–6, 6–1.

Seeds

Note: Anastasia Potapova, who entered late and played in the qualifying tournament, would have been seeded 7th if she had entered the tournament prior to the initial entry cutoff date of 3 June 2019.

Draw

Finals

Top half

Bottom half

Qualifying

Seeds

Qualifiers

Lucky losers

Draw

First qualifier

Second qualifier

Third qualifier

Fourth qualifier

Fifth qualifier

Sixth qualifier

References

Sources
Main Draw
Qualifying Draw

Ladies Open Lausanne
WTA Swiss Open